This is chronological list of thriller films split by decade. Often there may be considerable overlap particularly between thriller and other genres (including, action, crime, and horror films); the list should attempt to document films which are more closely related to thriller, even if it bends genres.

Films by decade
List of thriller films before 1940
List of thriller films of the 1940s
List of thriller films of the 1950s
List of thriller films of the 1960s
List of thriller films of the 1970s
List of thriller films of the 1980s
List of thriller films of the 1990s
List of thriller films of the 2000s
List of thriller films of the 2010s
List of thriller films of the 2020s

See also
List of science fiction thriller films

Lists of films by genre